Bill Wimmer is an American railroad executive who worked in operations for the Union Pacific Railroad.

Career
Wimmer started with the Chicago and North Western Railway in 1957, eventually becoming division engineer. He moved to Union Pacific in 1974.

As Vice President-Engineering, he was awarded the 2007 Railroader of the Year award. He was the second chief engineer to receive the award, after 1978's Robert M. Brown, also of Union Pacific, who had been his mentor. In June 2008, he was promoted to Vice President-Operations; he retired shortly thereafter, in July. He has served on the board of the R.J. Corman Railroad Group since December 2009.

Since retiring, he and his wife run a railroad museum in Beaver Lake, south of Plattsmouth, Nebraska.

See also
List of railroad executives

References

21st-century American railroad executives
Union Pacific Railroad people
Living people
People from Cass County, Nebraska
Year of birth missing (living people)